Jesús Rodríguez Quintero (18 August 1940 – 3 October 2022) was a Spanish journalist, editor and presenter of Spanish programs in radio and television, known in the media as Jesús Quintero.

Biography
Quintero was born in San Juan del Puerto, Huelva, Spain, on 18 August 1940. He was introduced into the theatrical world and from there jumped to RNE (Radio Nacional de España) in 1973, which began a long career as a presenter. His first program was Studio 15-18, presented with Marisol Valle. It was a great success and the star program in the attempted normalization of public radio programming that passed from dictatorship to a new period.

Quintero's flagship program, with schemes that would revolutionize the media was El hombre de la roulot (Man of Roulotte) and El loco de la colina (The fool on the hill), which made him a social phenomenon even outside Spain, Argentina or Uruguay.

Quintero also appeared as a lecturer in the teaching world, such as when he delivered the conference Journalism and Commitment on 17 October 2002 at the Faculty of Communication Sciences of the University of Málaga, on his tenth anniversary. After this speech, he unveiled a plaque to baptize one of the classrooms of the center with his name, sign of respect and admiration that produces the journalist.

Quintero was producer of the singer Soledad Bravo and guitarist Paco de Lucía.

Quintero was author of the books Trece noches (Thirteen nights) (1999) with Antonio Gala, Cuerda de presos (Prisoners Rope) (1997) and Jesús Quintero: entrevista (Jesús Quintero: Interview) (2007).

Quintero died on 3 October 2022, at the age of 82.

In radio
 Música de los cinco continentes (Music from five continents)
 Círculo internacional (International circle)
 Estudio 15/18 (Studio 15/18)
 A 120 
 Ciudades (Cities)
 El hombre de la Roulotte (Man of Roulotte)
 Tres a las tres (Three to three)
 Andalucía Viva (Andalucía alive)
 El loco de la colina (The fool on the hill) (1981–1986), RNE and Cadena Ser
 El lobo estepario (Steppenwolf), 1992, Onda Cero
 Entre dos luces (Between two lights), 2002

In television
 El perro verde (The green dog), 1988, in TVE
 Qué sabe nadie (Does anyone know), 1990–1991, in Canal Sur
 Trece noches (Thirteen nights), 1991–1992, in Canal Sur
 La boca del lobo (The mouth of the wolf), 1992–1993, in Antena 3
 Cuerda de presos (Chain gang), 1995–1996, in Antena 3
 El Vagamundo, 1999–2002, in Canal Sur
 Ratones coloraos, 2002–2004, in Canal Sur
 El loco de la colina (The fool on the hill), 2006, in TVE
 La noche de Quintero (The night of Quintero), 2007, in TVE
 Ratones coloraos, 2007–2009, in Canal Sur, Telemadrid and 7 Región de Murcia
 El mundo de Jesús Quintero (The world of Jesús Quintero), summer 2008, in Canal Sur
 El gatopardo, 2010–20??, in Canal Sur
 La noche del loco (The night of the crazy)
 El sol, la sal y el son in Canal Sur
 El loco soy yo (I'm crazy) in Canal Sur
 Un loco en América in Telemundo

Awards
 National Communication Media Award (2006)
 Television presenter of the year (2006)
 Golden antenna for his program, El Vagamundo (2003)
 Premio Ondas (2001)
 Award Best interviewer of the Millennium
 Award Andaluz of the 2000 year Award King of Spain'' of journalism (1990)
 Premio Ondas Internacional (1990)
 Medal of Andalucía
 Knight of Argamasilla de Alba
 Award for the most innovative radio done

References

1940 births
2022 deaths
Spanish editors
Spanish journalists
Spanish television directors
Spanish television presenters
Spanish radio presenters
People from the Province of Huelva